Cheshmeh-ye Rashid Meleh Bahram Beygi (also Romanized as Cheshmeh-ye Rashīd Meleh Bahrām Beygī) is a village in Margown Rural District, Margown District, Boyer-Ahmad County, Kohgiluyeh and Boyer-Ahmad Province, Iran. At the 2006 census, its population was 26, in 4 families.

References 

Populated places in Boyer-Ahmad County